The Convention for the Conservation of Antarctic Seals (CCAS) is part of the Antarctic Treaty System. It was signed at the conclusion of a multilateral conference in London on February 11, 1972.

Contents 
CCAS had the objective "to promote and achieve the protection, scientific study, and rational use of Antarctic seals, and to maintain a satisfactory balance within the ecological system of Antarctica.

CCAS forbids the killing or capture of Antarctic seals except in specific circumstances. The contracting parties of CCAS may decide the standards for killing and capture as dynamics of the seal populations change, and these decisions should be "based upon the best scientific and technical evidence available".

CCAS also mandates communication between the different countries that signed it regarding all research, hunting, and capture of seals. The scientific aspect of this communication is done through the Scientific Committee on Antarctic Research.

Scope 
The geographic range of the agreement covers all seas south of 60°S latitude. It protects the following seal species:

 Mirounga leonina Southern elephant seal
 Hydrurga leptonyx Leopard seal
 Leptonychotes weddelli Weddell seal
 Lobodon carcinophagus Crabeater seal
 Ommatophoca rossi Ross seal
 Arctocephalus sp. Southern fur seals

At the time of creation, all fur seals in the Antarctic area where in the genus Arctocephalus, however since then many species formerly in that genus have been reclassified under Arctophoca with only A. pusillus remaining.

History 
Shortly after the discovery of Antarctica, people began hunting seals at an unsustainable rate. Many species were close to extinction before the signing of CCAS.

It was opened for ratification on June 1, 1972, and entered into force on March 11, 1978.

The 17 parties to CCAS are Argentina, Australia, Belgium, Brazil, Canada, Chile, France, Germany, Italy, Japan, Norway, Poland, Russia, South Africa, United Kingdom, and the United States. New Zealand has signed, but not ratified the convention.

The countries meet at least every five years after 1972 to review CCAS, as is mandated in Article 7.

References

1978 in Antarctica 
Antarctica agreements
Cold War treaties
Seal conservation
Environmental treaties
Treaties concluded in 1972
Treaties entered into force in 1978
1978 in the environment
Treaties of Argentina
Treaties of Australia
Treaties of Belgium
Treaties of the military dictatorship in Brazil
Treaties of Canada
Treaties of Chile
Treaties of France
Treaties of West Germany
Treaties of Italy
Treaties of Japan
Treaties of Norway
Treaties of the Polish People's Republic
Treaties of the Soviet Union
Treaties of South Africa
Treaties of the United States
Treaties of the United Kingdom
Animal treaties